Antofagasta is a word of Quechua or Aymara origin meaning "town of the great saltpeter bed." It may refer to:

In Chile:
Antofagasta, port city and commune in the north of the country
Antofagasta Region, the country's second administrative region
Antofagasta Province, province in the north of the country
Antofagasta PLC, a copper-mining company named after the region
Club de Deportes Antofagasta, a soccer club based in Antofagasta
Ferrocarril de Antofagasta a Bolivia, a non-government railway operating in the northern provinces of the country
Roman Catholic Archdiocese of Antofagasta, an archdiocese located in the city of Antofagasta
2007 Antofagasta earthquake, M7.7 shock on November 14
Estadio Regional de Antofagasta, a multi-use stadium in Antofagasta
University of Antofagasta, higher-learning institution in Antofagasta
La Negra Antofagasta, a small industrial complex 22 km. east of Antofagasta
Club Hípico de Antofagasta, a thoroughbred race track in Antofagasta

In Argentina:
Antofagasta de la Sierra, a volcanic field
Antofagasta de la Sierra, Catamarca, a village in the Catamarca Province
Antofagasta de la Sierra Department, the northernmost department of Catamarca Province

In Peru:
BAP Antofagasta (SS-32), one of two Type 209/1200 submarines ordered by the Peruvian Navy on August 12, 1976